Hermogenes is a Greek name, meaning "born of Hermes". It may refer to:

 Hermogenes (potter) (fl. c. 550 BC), Attic Greek potter
 Hermogenes (philosopher) (fl. c. 400 BC), Greek
 Hermogenes of Priene (fl. c. 200 BC), Greek architect
 Hermogenes (fl. c. 64), in 2 Timothy 1, a former Christian who turned away from Saint Paul in Asia
 Hermagoras of Aquileia (also called Hermogenes, died ) Christian bishop
 Hermogenes, magician in The Golden Legend
 Hermogenes of Tarsus (fl. late 2nd century), Roman-era rhetorician and historian
 Hermogenes (4th cent.), son of Hermogenes, Christian priest of Caesarea (Cappadocia), predecessor of Dianius, and scribe/author of the Nicene Creed (Bas. ep. 81.244.9, 263.3)

 Hermogenes (magister officiorum), (fl. 530s), Byzantine official and military leader
 Patriarch Hermogenes (died 1612), Russian religious leader  
 Hermogenes, Bishop of Tobolsk and Siberia (1858–1918), Russian religious leader
 Hermógenes Fonseca (born 1908), Brazilian footballer
 Hermógenes L. Mora (born 1979), Nicaraguan poet

Greek masculine given names